Right as Rain is a 2001 crime novel by George Pelecanos.

Right as Rain may also refer to:

 "Right as Rain", a song by Adele from the album 19, 2008
 "Right as Rain", a song by Alison Moyet from the album The Minutes, 2013
 "Right as Rain", a song by the band Collective Soul from the album Blood, 2019
 "Right as Rain", a song by the band Deus from the album Worst Case Scenario, 1994
 "Right as Rain", a song by the band Face to Face from the album Three Chords and a Half Truth, 2013
 Right as Rain, a 2007 album by the singer Gia Ciambotti